Swan Princess may refer to:

 the main character from the ballet Swan Lake
 The Swan Princess, a 1994 American animated musical fantasy film
 The Swan Princess (film series), the franchise
 The Swan Princess (soundtrack), the soundtrack
 Swan Princess (horse), a British racehorse